The 1952–53 Idaho Vandals men's basketball team represented the University of Idaho during the 1952–53 NCAA college basketball season. Members of the Pacific Coast Conference, the Vandals were led by sixth-year head coach Charles Finley and played their home games on campus at Memorial Gymnasium in Moscow, Idaho.

Late in the season, Idaho handed the third-ranked and Final Four-bound Washington Huskies their sole conference loss.

References

External links
Sports Reference – Idaho Vandals: 1952–53 basketball season
Gem of the Mountains: 1953 University of Idaho yearbook – 1952–53 basketball season
Idaho Argonaut – student newspaper – 1953 editions

Idaho Vandals men's basketball seasons
Idaho
Idaho
Idaho